The PARM 1 (DM-12) and PARM 2 (DM-22) are German off-route mines that fire small fin stabilized rockets. PARM stands for PanzerAbwehrRichtMine, anti-tank directional mine.

1600 DM-22 mines were delivered to Ukrainian armed services in early May 2022.

Development
The mine was developed in the early 1980s to meet the US MIL-STD-331A and US MIL-STD-810C requirements. Trials of the mine were conducted between March 1983 and March 1988. In June 1988 it was accepted into service with the Bundeswehr, with the Army receiving the first batch of 25,000 between 1991 and 1994. The PARM 2 was a development of PARM 1 incorporating an infra-red sensor and an improved rocket.

PARM 1
The PARM 1 is mounted on a small tripod, allowing it to be traversed through 360 degrees, elevated to 90 degrees and depressed to −45 degrees. The mine is manually emplaced and incorporates an arming delay of five minutes. It can be detonated either by command or by a fibre optic trigger cable, which triggers the mine when it is crushed.

PARM 2
It can be programmed to be active for between several hours and 30 days.

Specifications

See also
 M24 mine
 TM-83 mine
 MPB mine
 List of foreign aid to Ukraine during the Russo-Ukrainian War

References

 
 Jane's Mines and Mine Clearance 2005-2006

Anti-tank mines
Land mines of Germany